Leopoldo Dominico Loreto Petilla is a Filipino politician from the province of Leyte in the Philippines. He has served as Governor of Leyte from 2013 until 2022. He was first elected as Governor of the province in 2013 and was re-elected in 2016 and 2019.

References

External links
Province of Leyte Official Website

Living people
Governors of Leyte (province)
PDP–Laban politicians
Year of birth missing (living people)